Hexton is a village and rural area in the Gisborne District of New Zealand's North Island. It is located north-west of Gisborne City, and includes the settlements of Makauri and Waerengaahika.

The fertile plain east of the Waipaoa River was settled by the 19th century by families of Hampshire in southern England, with assistance from the New Zealand Government. The de Latour family named the area after their English village of Hexton.

The Chitty Family began growing wine in the area during the 1930s and 1940s, becoming one of three dominant families in Gisborne's early wine industry.

Demographics
Hexton is in three SA1 statistical areas which cover . The SA1 areas are part of the Hexton statistical area.

The SA1 areas had a population of 594 at the 2018 New Zealand census, an increase of 96 people (19.3%) since the 2013 census, and an increase of 204 people (52.3%) since the 2006 census. There were 198 households, comprising 291 males and 303 females, giving a sex ratio of 0.96 males per female, with 123 people (20.7%) aged under 15 years, 99 (16.7%) aged 15 to 29, 273 (46.0%) aged 30 to 64, and 99 (16.7%) aged 65 or older.

Ethnicities were 93.9% European/Pākehā, 13.1% Māori, 0.5% Pacific peoples, 0.5% Asian, and 1.5% other ethnicities. People may identify with more than one ethnicity.

Although some people chose not to answer the census's question about religious affiliation, 54.0% had no religion, 35.9% were Christian, 0.5% had Māori religious beliefs, 0.5% were Buddhist and 0.5% had other religions.

Of those at least 15 years old, 81 (17.2%) people had a bachelor's or higher degree, and 69 (14.6%) people had no formal qualifications. 99 people (21.0%) earned over $70,000 compared to 17.2% nationally. The employment status of those at least 15 was that 258 (54.8%) people were employed full-time, 111 (23.6%) were part-time, and 12 (2.5%) were unemployed.

Hexton statistical area

Hexton statistical area had a population of 2,946 at the 2018 New Zealand census, an increase of 258 people (9.6%) since the 2013 census, and an increase of 450 people (18.0%) since the 2006 census. There were 1,035 households, comprising 1,506 males and 1,440 females, giving a sex ratio of 1.05 males per female. The median age was 44.2 years (compared with 37.4 years nationally), with 615 people (20.9%) aged under 15 years, 441 (15.0%) aged 15 to 29, 1,413 (48.0%) aged 30 to 64, and 477 (16.2%) aged 65 or older.

Ethnicities were 85.4% European/Pākehā, 21.8% Māori, 1.5% Pacific peoples, 1.9% Asian, and 2.0% other ethnicities. People may identify with more than one ethnicity.

The percentage of people born overseas was 10.9, compared with 27.1% nationally.

Although some people chose not to answer the census's question about religious affiliation, 51.1% had no religion, 38.5% were Christian, 1.4% had Māori religious beliefs, 0.1% were Muslim, 0.2% were Buddhist and 1.0% had other religions.

Of those at least 15 years old, 438 (18.8%) people had a bachelor's or higher degree, and 405 (17.4%) people had no formal qualifications. The median income was $37,500, compared with $31,800 nationally. 492 people (21.1%) earned over $70,000 compared to 17.2% nationally. The employment status of those at least 15 was that 1,281 (55.0%) people were employed full-time, 477 (20.5%) were part-time, and 42 (1.8%) were unemployed.

Marae

Tarere Marae and Te Aotipu meeting house is a meeting place of the hapū of Te Whānau a Iwi.

Education

References

Populated places in the Gisborne District